The 1973–74 NBA season was the Rockets' 7th season in the NBA and 3rd season in the city of Houston.

Offseason

Roster

Regular season

Season standings

Record vs. opponents

Game log

Draft picks

References

Houston
Houston Rockets seasons